Al Mallu is a 2020 Indian Malayalam-language comedy drama film directed by Boban Samuel, produced by Sajils Majeed under the banner of Mehfil Productions. It stars Namitha Pramod and Miya George in lead roles.

Cast

Release 
The film released on 17 January 2020.

Soundtrack 
Lyrics are written by B.K. Harinarayanan and music composed by Ranjin Raj.

References

External links

Indian comedy-drama films
2020s Malayalam-language films
2020 comedy-drama films
2020 films
Films shot in Abu Dhabi
Films set in the United Arab Emirates
Films directed by Boban Samuel